A military command or order is a binding instruction given by a senior rank to a junior rank in a military context. Not all senior ranks in all military have the right to give an order to all lower ranks. A general order is a published directive by an officer in a command post, which is binding on all ranks under his command, and intended to enforce a policy or procedure.

US military
In the US military an operations order is a plan format meant which is intended to assist subordinate units with the conduct of military operations.

See also
Superior orders
Führerprinzip
Nuremberg principles

References

Military law